Mourecochylis dentipara is a species of moth of the family Tortricidae. It is found in Carchi Province, Ecuador.

The wingspan is about 12 mm. The ground colour of the forewings of the males is creamy ochreous, suffused with brownish, especially in the basal area and at the apex. The hindwings are grey creamy. The ground colour of the female forewings is ochreous brownish, but paler postmedially. The hindwings are pale brownish grey.

References

Moths described in 2002
Cochylini